Thought is a 1916 Russian silent film directed by Vladimir Gardin and Joseph Soiffer. The film is based on a story by Leonid Andreyev.

Starring 
 Gregori Chmara
 N. Komarovskaya

References

External links 

1916 films
1910s Russian-language films
Russian silent films
Russian black-and-white films
Films of the Russian Empire
Films based on works by Leonid Andreyev